Millom was a rural district in Cumberland in England from 1934 to 1974.

It was formed by a County Review Order in 1934 by the merger of the Millom urban district with most of the Bootle Rural District.

It continued in existence until 1 April 1974, when it was merged by the Local Government Act 1972 to form the Copeland district of Cumbria.

References

History of Cumberland
History of Cumbria
Districts of England abolished by the Local Government Act 1972
1934 establishments in England